Seyyid Abdullah Pasha (also known as Boynueğri Seyyid Abdullah Pasha "Seyyid Abdullah Pasha the Crooked-neck"; died March 1761, Aleppo) was an Ottoman statesman who served as grand vizier from 1747 to 1750. He also served as the Ottoman governor of Cyprus (1745–46, again in 1746–47), Rakka (1746), Konya (1750), Bosnia (1750–51), Egypt (1751–52), Diyarbekir (1752–60), and Aleppo (1760).

Abdullah Pasha was born in Kirkuk, the son of Blond Seyyid Hasan Aga, who served as grand sheyhulislam before him. He attended the Enderun palace school as a youth and became a vizier in December 1745.

He died in office as governor of Aleppo in March 1760.

See also
 List of Ottoman Grand Viziers
 List of Ottoman governors of Egypt
 List of Ottoman governors of Bosnia

References

1761 deaths
People from Kirkuk
18th-century Grand Viziers of the Ottoman Empire
18th-century Ottoman governors of Egypt
Ottoman governors of Egypt
Year of birth unknown
Ottoman governors of Bosnia
Pashas
Ottoman governors of Aleppo
Ottoman governors of Cyprus